Zahir Zerdab (born 9 January 1982 in Amiens) is a former footballer; he most recently played as a midfielder for MC Alger. Born in France, he represented Algeria at international level.

Club career
On 16 June 2011, Zerdab announced that he would be leaving JSM Béjaïa and joining Championnat National side FC Rouen at the end of the 2010–11 Algerian Ligue Professionnelle 1 season.

International career
On 8 October 2010, Zerdab made his debut for the Algerian A' National Team in a friendly against Mali. He started the game and was subbed off by Moustapha Djallit.

References

External links
 
 DZFoot.com Profile
 

1982 births
Living people
Kabyle people
Sportspeople from Amiens
Footballers from Hauts-de-France
French footballers
Algerian footballers
French sportspeople of Algerian descent
French people of Kabyle descent
Algerian expatriate footballers
Algerian expatriate sportspeople in Belgium
French expatriate sportspeople in Belgium
French expatriate footballers
Expatriate footballers in Belgium
JSM Béjaïa players
AS Beauvais Oise players
S.V. Zulte Waregem players
Stade de Reims players
Algerian Ligue Professionnelle 1 players
Ligue 2 players
Belgian Pro League players
Algeria A' international footballers
Algeria international footballers
FC Rouen players
CS Constantine players
MO Béjaïa players
Association football midfielders